The Svätý Anton manor house is a late baroque-classicist mansion constructed in 1744 with an English landscape garden park in Svätý Anton, Slovakia. It was one of the main residences of the Saxe-Coburg and Gotha-Koháry family. Both the mansion and park are open to the public.

History

The beginning
The village of Svätý Anton was mentioned for the first time in 1266. In 1405, the sons of Ladilaslav Kakas acquire the village from the Hungarian king Sigismund of Luxembourg (1368-1437). In 1415, a small castle was erected to protect a profitable toll station. In the second half of the 15th century, the castle came into the possession of the lords of Čabraď Castle.

In the 16th century, Cardinal Tamás Bakócz and Peter Pálffy belonged to the owners of the castle. The castle was strongly rebuilt to protect it against the Turkish invasions under the guidance of an architect called Giullio Ferrari.

Koháry family
In 1622, the estates of Čabraď castle and Svätý Anton came in the hands of the House of Koháry family, a family who gained its wealth due to its loyalty to the House of Habsburg. They replaced medieval castle by a two-winged manor during the 17th century.
In 1744, count Andrew Kohary (1694-1757) decided to move his ancestral seat from Čabraď castle to Svätý Anton. As part of this move, he reconstructed the manor into a four-winged manor house with an inner courtyard between 1744 and 1750. The baroque interior was finished in 1752. He was succeeded by his sons Nikolaus (1721-1769), Ignac (1726-1777), and Jan. The last Kohary to live at Svätý Anton was Ferenc József (17767-1826), who was elevated to prince by Emperor Francis I of Austria in 1815.

Saxe-Coburg and Gotha-Koháry family
Ferenc József's daughter, princess Maria Antonia (1797-1862), inherited all his estates and wealth. She was one of the three largest landowners in the kingdom of Hungary. On 30 November 1815, in Vienna, Maria Antonia married Prince Ferdinand of Saxe-Coburg and Gotha (1785-1851). He was an elder brother of Prince Leopold, future King of the Belgians but then consort to Princess Charlotte of Wales, who was expected to inherit the crown of Great Britain, and also elder brother of the Duchess of Kent, mother of the future Queen Victoria. They founded the Koháry branch of the House of Saxe-Coburg and Gotha (the Catholic branch). Until the First World War, they belonged to the three largest landowners in Hungary.

The grandson of Ferdinand and Maria Antonia became the first king of Bulgaria, Ferdinand I of Bulgaria. After the first world war, he abdicated and left Bulgaria to live in Svätý Anton, Predná Hora, and the Palais Coburg in Vienna. He was devoted to botany, ornithology, and entomology. Also, he liked to hunt and travel around Slovakia in his Mercedes car. In 1944, the king had to leave Slovakia together with the retreating German Army. He fled to Coburg, where he lived in the ‘Bulgaren Schlösschen’ until his death in 1948.

After the Second World War until Today
After the Second World War, the Communist government confiscated the Kohary estates. In the 1950s, the manor house became the seat of a Forestry, Wood and Hunting Museum, a specialized museum with remarkable collections of natural history, history and art. The exhibition focuses on how the Hungarian nobility lived the 18th and 19th centuries, as well as on the development of forestry and hunting in Slovakia.

Architecture and Interior
The four-story building with a central courtyard has all the features of a representative residence. Most of the rooms, halls and corridors have preserved their original interior from the Baroque, Rococo and Empire periods. They have only been minimally affected by later renovations in 1816 and 1860.

In the north wing, an arched underpass with a view into the courtyard leads to a representative staircase, the architecture of which was complemented by paintings and sculptures reflecting the influences of Italian and Austrian art. From there, the first floor is reached leading into the many state rooms and corridors of the mansion.

A chapel richly decorated with frescoes of a late-baroque illusionist space with a free view emerges from the southern tract of the mansion. It is dedicated to the Assumption of the Virgin Mary. The chapel is also highlighted on the outside on the facade, which ends with a fresco connecting the church theme with the motif of the image of the donor.

Trivia
According to legend, the mansion is constructed such that it symbolizes the calendar year: It has four gates (= seasons), twelve chimneys (= months), 52 rooms (= weeks), seven arcades (= days of the week) and 365 windows (= days). However, today, after many reconstructions, it is no longer possible to confirm this.

Garden

A park that melts into a forest is part of the manor house estate. The central part is around five hectares, while the forest park consists of 25 hectares. The center was a French regular baroque garden combined with a natural-landscape English section. Currently, remnants of regular baroque type of treatment can be seen on the terraces near the main building. They loosely melt into landscape park and forested park. The preserved water system of the park is supplied with water from the Kolpassky brook through some kilometres long water gang with aqueducts. In a corner of the park there is an artificial grotto, which the locals call ‘hell’.

Until 1995, the meadow in front of the cage was dominated by an almost-120-year-old Giant Sequoya (Sequoiadendron giganteum). Prince Philipp of Saxe-Coburg and Gotha planted it there in 1878 when his only son Leopold was born. In spite of many attempts to save it, the Sequoya dried. A new and healthy tree was then planted at the entrance to the park in 1996.

References

Literature

External links
 
 

Castles in Slovakia
Buildings and structures in Banská Bystrica Region
House of Saxe-Coburg and Gotha
House of Saxe-Coburg-Gotha-Koháry
House of Koháry